is the 23rd single by the Japanese pop singer and songwriter Miho Komatsu released under Giza studio label. It was released 20 October 2004. The single reached #29 and sold 5,204 copies. It charted for 3 weeks and sold 6,856 copies overall.

Track list
All songs are written and composed by Miho Komatsu

arrangement: Hirohito Furui (Garnet Crow)
it was used as theme song for the NTV show Music Fighter

arrangement: Hiroshi Asai (The Tambourines)
"sun and moon"
arrangement: Hitoshi Okamoto (Garnet Crow)
 (instrumental)

References 

2004 singles
Miho Komatsu songs
Songs written by Miho Komatsu
2004 songs
Giza Studio singles
Being Inc. singles
Song recordings produced by Daiko Nagato